Theodore Wesley Koch (August 4, 1871 – March 23, 1941) was the Director of Northwestern University's library (1919–1941), and the Director of the University of Michigan Library (1905–1915).  He also held positions at the Cornell University Library and the Library of Congress.

Biography
Koch was born in Philadelphia in 1871, the son of William Jefferson Koch (pronounced by the family as "coke") a descendant of German immigrants ("Pennsylvania Dutch").  Koch receive a BA from the University of Pennsylvania, followed by a second BA and an MA from Harvard University (1893 and 1894 respectively) in Romance Languages.  He went on to study in Paris, before returning to Cornell University, where he was responsible for producing a detailed, annotated catalogue of Cornell's extensive collection of Dante's works.

Koch was the Director of the Library of Northwestern University (1919–1941), during which time he planned and raised the funds for the Deering Library at Northwestern. His bust is carved into a pillar next to the entrance to the stacks. 

During World War I, while on the staff of the Library of Congress, Koch played an instrumental role in ensuring that scientific publications from Germany and other combatants continued to be available to American researchers.  He also organized programs to provide books to American soldiers in the trenches, and after the end of the war was very active in organizing American support for the rebuilding of European libraries that had been destroyed during the war.

He was a translator of Italian poetry and essays; scholar of Dante; widely published on issues of libraries and public education from the 1910s to the late 1930s.

In 1940 he received the Cross of the Legion of Honor from the French Government, for his lifelong work in translating, promoting, and enhancing the appreciation of French literature in the United States.  He translated a series of books on French bibliophiles. 

He died in 1941, a few months short of his scheduled retirement.

References

External links
 The Library Assistant's Manual by Koch
 
 
 

American librarians
1941 deaths
1871 births
American translators
Cornell University faculty
Grand Croix of the Légion d'honneur
Harvard University alumni
Library of Congress
Northwestern University faculty
People from Philadelphia
University of Michigan faculty
University of Pennsylvania alumni